is a railway station in Oshamambe, Hokkaido, Japan, operated by Hokkaido Railway Company (JR Hokkaido).

Lines

The first phase to Shin-Hakodate-Hokuto opened in 2016.

Station layout
The station consists of two ground-level island platforms serving four tracks.

Platforms

Limited express services

 Hokuto ( – )

History
The station opened on 3 November 1903. With the privatization of Japanese National Railways (JNR) on 1 April 1987, the station came under the control of JR Hokkaido.

Surrounding area
 National Route 5
 National Route 37
 Tokyo University of Science Oshamambe Campus
 Hokkaido Oshamambe High School

Bus services
Hakodate Bus
For Imakane and Setana
For Yakumo, Mori, and Hakodate
Niseko Bus
For Kuromatsunai and Suttsu

See also
 List of railway stations in Japan

References

External links

 Oshamambe Station information 

Railway stations in Hokkaido Prefecture
Railway stations in Japan opened in 1903
Hokkaido Shinkansen